This article lists the youth wings of political parties in Indonesia. This list also includes student wings.

Currently affiliated with political party

Formerly affiliated with political party

References

Bibliography 
 
 
 
 

Youth wings of political parties in Indonesia